Attulus is a genus of jumping spiders that was first described by Eugène Louis Simon in 1889. The name is a diminutive form of a common prefix for salticid genera, .

Taxonomy
In 1889, Eugène Simon separated the genus Attulus from the genus Attus. The correct name of the type species involves some taxonomic complexity. Simon gave Attus cinereus Westring, 1861 as the type of the genus. However, this name had already been used by Walckenaer in 1837 for a different species, so Simon's 1871 replacement name Attus helveolus is used instead. A. helveolus is now regarded as the same species as Attus distinguendus, described by Simon in 1868, so having priority as a name. Thus the type species is currently known as Attulus distinguendus.

Within the family Salticidae, Attulus is placed in the tribe Sitticini (the sitticines). The taxonomy of the tribe and the genus Attulus has been subject to considerable uncertainty; some species changed genus repeatedly between 2017 and 2020. For example, Attulus floricola was known as Sitticus floricola until moved to Sittiflor floricola in 2017, to Calositticus floricola in 2018, back to Sitticus floricola in 2019, and then to Attulus floricola in 2020. Most sitticines were placed in Sitticus until 2017, when Jerzy Prószyński split the genus into seven: Attulus, Sitticus and five new genera Sittiab, Sittiflor, Sittilong, Sittipub and Sittisax. This division was not based on a phylogenetic analysis but was intended to be "pragmatic". A molecular phylogenetic analysis in 2020 restored most sitticine species to a single genus. Although Sitticus had been used in this sense for a long time, Attulus Simon, 1889 has priority over Sitticus Simon, 1901, so is the name currently used. Attulus is circumscribed to include Sitticus, Sittiflor, Sittilong and Sittipub. (Prószyński's Sittisax was retained, but his Sittiab was synonymized with Attinella.)

Phylogeny
In 2020, Wayne Maddison and co-workers divided the tribe Sitticini into two subtribes, Aillutticina and Sitticina. Attulus was placed in Sitticina, and divided into three subgenera, A. (Sittilong) with one species, A. (Sitticus) with seven species, and A. (Attulus) with 41 species. The relationship between these taxa is shown in the following cladogram.

Species
, the World Spider Catalog recognized 58 species in the genus Attulus. They are found in Asia, Europe and North America:
Attulus albolineatus (Kulczyński, 1895) – Russia (South Siberia to Far East), China, Korea
Attulus ammophilus (Thorell, 1875) – Romania, Ukraine, Russia (Europe)
Attulus ansobicus (Andreeva, 1976) – Kazakhstan, Central Asia
Attulus atricapillus (Simon, 1882) – Europe, Turkey
Attulus avocator (O. Pickard-Cambridge, 1885) – Kazakhstan, Central Asia, China, Korea, Japan
Attulus barsakelmes (Logunov & Rakov, 1998) – Russia (Europe), Kazakhstan
Attulus burjaticus (Danilov & Logunov, 1994) – Russia (South Siberia)
Attulus caricis (Westring, 1861) – Europe, Turkey, Caucasus, Russia (Europe to Far East), Kazakhstan, Mongolia
Attulus cautus (Peckham & Peckham, 1888) – Mexico
Attulus clavator (Schenkel, 1936) – China
Attulus cutleri (Prószyński, 1980) – North America, Russia (Middle Siberia to Far East)
Attulus damini (Chyzer, 1891) – Southern Europe, Ukraine, Russia (Caucasus)
Attulus diductus (O. Pickard-Cambridge, 1885) – Karakorum, China 
Attulus distinguendus (Simon, 1868) (type) – Europe, Turkey, Caucasus, Russia (Europe to Far East), Kazakhstan, China
Attulus dubatolovi (Logunov & Rakov, 1998) – Kazakhstan
Attulus dudkoi (Logunov, 1998) – Russia (South Siberia) 
Attulus dyali (Roewer, 1951) – Pakistan
Attulus dzieduszyckii (L. Koch, 1870) – Europe, Russia (Europe, West Siberia)
Attulus eskovi (Logunov & Wesołowska, 1995) – Russia (Far East)
Attulus fasciger (Simon, 1880) – Russia (Middle Siberia to Far East), China, Korea, Japan. Introduced to North America
Attulus finschi (L. Koch, 1879) – USA, Canada, Russia (West Siberia to Far East)
Attulus floricola (C. L. Koch, 1837) – Canada, USA, Europe, Caucasus, Russia (Europe to Far East), Kazakhstan, Central Asia, China, Japan 
Attulus godlewskii (Kulczyński, 1895) – Russia (Middle Siberia to Far East), China, Korea, Japan. Introduced to North America
Attulus goricus (Ovtsharenko, 1978) – Caucasus (Russia, Georgia)
Attulus hirokii Ono & Ogata, 2018 – Japan
Attulus inexpectus (Logunov & Kronestedt, 1997) – Europe, Turkey, Azerbaijan, Russia (Europe to West Siberia), Kazakhstan, Central Asia
Attulus inopinabilis (Logunov, 1992) – Ukraine, Russia (Urals), Kazakhstan, Kyrgyzstan
Attulus japonicus (Kishida, 1910) – Japan
Attulus karakumensis (Logunov, 1992) – Iran, Turkmenistan
Attulus kazakhstanicus (Logunov, 1992) – Kazakhstan
Attulus longipes (Canestrini, 1873) – Alps (France, Italy, Switzerland, Austria)
Attulus mirandus (Logunov, 1993) – Kazakhstan, Central Asia, Russia (South Siberia), China
Attulus monstrabilis (Logunov, 1992) – Kazakhstan, Kyrgyzstan
Attulus montanus Kishida, 1910) – Japan
Attulus nakamurae (Kishida, 1910) – Japan
Attulus nenilini (Logunov & Wesolowska, 1993) – Kazakhstan, Kyrgyzstan
Attulus nitidus (Hu, 2001) – China
Attulus niveosignatus (Simon, 1880) – Nepal to China
Attulus penicillatus (Simon, 1875) – Europe, Caucasus, Russia (Europe to Far East), Kazakhstan, China, Korea, Japan
Attulus penicilloides (Wesolowska, 1981) – North Korea
Attulus pubescens (Fabricius, 1775) – Europe, Turkey, Caucasus, Afghanistan. Introduced to USA
Attulus pulchellus (Logunov, 1992) – Kazakhstan, Kyrgyzstan
Attulus relictarius (Logunov, 1998) – Caucasus (Russia, Georgia, Azerbaijan), Iran
Attulus rivalis (Simon, 1937) – France
Attulus rupicola (C. L. Koch, 1837) – Europe
Attulus saevus (Dönitz & Strand, 1906) – Japan
Attulus saganus (Dönitz & Strand, 1906) – Japan
Attulus saltator (O. Pickard-Cambridge, 1868) – Europe, Turkey, Russia (Europe to South Siberia), Kazakhstan
Attulus sinensis (Schenkel, 1963) – China, Korea?
Attulus striatus (Emerton, 1911) – USA, Canada
Attulus subadultus (Dönitz & Strand, 1906) – Japan
Attulus sylvestris (Emerton, 1891) – Canada, USA 
Attulus talgarensis (Logunov & Wesolowska, 1993) – Kazakhstan, Kyrgyzstan
Attulus tannuolana (Logunov, 1991) – Russia (South Siberia) 
Attulus terebratus (Clerck, 1757) – Europe, Turkey, Caucasus, Russia (Europe to South Siberia), Kazakhstan, Mongolia
Attulus vilis (Kulczyński, 1895) – Ukraine, Russia (Europe), Turkey, Caucasus, Iran, Kazakhstan, Central Asia
Attulus zaisanicus (Logunov, 1998) – Kazakhstan
Attulus zimmermanni Simon, 1877 – Europe, Turkey, Azerbaijan, Russia (Europe to South Siberia), Kazakhstan, Turkmenistan

References

Palearctic spiders
Sitticini
Salticidae genera
Taxa named by Eugène Simon